Carol Corbu (born 8 February 1946) is a retired Romanian athlete who mostly competed in the triple jump. In this event he won the 1973 European Indoor Championships as well as two medals at the European Championships outdoor.

His personal best jump was 17.12 metres, achieved in June 1971 in Turin. This ranks him third among Romanian triple jumpers, only behind Marian Oprea and Bedros Bedrosian.

At the 1972 Olympics Corbu competed both in the long jump and triple jump.

International competitions

References

1946 births
Living people
Romanian male triple jumpers
Athletes (track and field) at the 1972 Summer Olympics
Athletes (track and field) at the 1976 Summer Olympics
Olympic athletes of Romania
European Athletics Championships medalists